Arctophila is a subgenus of hoverflies, in the genus Sericomyia from the family Syrphidae, in the order Diptera, comprising several hairy, bee-mimicking species.

Species
S. bequaerti (Hervé-Bazin, 1913)
S. bombiformis (Fallén, 1810)
S. flagrans (Osten Sacken, 1875)
S. harveyi (Osburn, 1908)
S. meyeri (Fluke, 1939)
S. superbiens (Müller, 1776)

References

Insect subgenera
Eristalinae